Julius and Harriet Bull House, also known as Ferry Farm, is a historic home located at Seneca Falls in Seneca County, New York.  The house is a four bay wide, two story cobblestone house.  It was built in 1830 and the facade is constructed of variously sized and colored field cobbles. The house is among the approximately 18 surviving cobblestone buildings in Seneca County. The house is believed to have been used as a stop on the Underground Railroad. Also on the property is a contributing carriage barn / workshop.

It was listed on the National Register of Historic Places in 2007.

References

Houses on the National Register of Historic Places in New York (state)
Cobblestone architecture
Houses completed in 1830
Houses in Seneca County, New York
Houses on the Underground Railroad
1830 establishments in New York (state)
National Register of Historic Places in Seneca County, New York
Seneca Falls, New York